Strictly Business is the debut album by hip-hop duo EPMD. It was released on June 7, 1988, by Fresh/Sleeping Bag Records around the world and BCM Records in Germany. It peaked at No. 80 on the Billboard 200 soon after release, yet it earned an RIAA gold album certification within four months of its release. In addition, it has received much positive critical attention since its release. In 2012, the album was ranked number 453 on Rolling Stone magazine's list of the 500 greatest albums of all time.

The album is known for its lighthearted party raps and funky sample-reliant production. The album has no guest emcees or producers except DJ K La Boss. The album is broken down track-by-track by the group in Brian Coleman's book Check the Technique.

Reception

Initial
Strictly Business peaked at No. 80 on the Billboard 200 and No. 1 on the Top R&B/Hip Hop Albums chart. Of its four singles, three landed on the UK Singles Chart and two reached the US Hot R&B/Hip-Hop Songs chart. Although none of the singles reached the Billboard Hot 100, the album was able to go gold within four months of its release. Strictly Business was featured on various "best of 1988" lists. The Face ranked it as the third best album of the year, and ranked its title track as the 25th best single of the year. Sounds judged it to be the 50th best album of the year, while Spex ranked it as the 8th best.

Retrospect
Years after its release, Strictly Business has continued to attract critical success. AllMusic called the album "simply amazing". The Source assigned the album a five-mic rating, making it one of 43 albums to ever receive this rating. In 1994, Pop selected it a complement to Eric B. & Rakim's Paid in Full on its list of The World's 100 Best Albums + 300 Complements. In 1998, The Source placed Strictly Business on its 100 Best Rap Albums list and included two of its singles on its 100 Best Rap Singles list. In 1999, it was judged to be the 4th-best hip hop album of 1988 by ego trip. In 2001, Dance de Lux ranked Strictly Business as the 11th-best hip hop record of all time. In 2003, the album was placed on Blender's 500 CDs You Must Own Before You Die list and ranked number 459 on Rolling Stone magazine's list of the 500 greatest albums of all time, and was moved up to 453 in a 2012 revised list. Additionally, the Rolling Stone Album Guide, which initially rated the album as three and a half stars out of five, awarded the album with a five-star rating in 2004. Retrospective reviews by Spin (1995), the Virgin Encyclopedia of Popular Music (2002), Martin C. Strong (2004), and Sputnikmusic (2006) have respectively allotted the album a nine-out-of-10 rating, a four-star rating, a five-star rating and a seven-out-of-10 rating. Strictly Business is now widely considered to be a classic release and a seminal hip hop album.

Track listing

Personnel
Erick Sermon – vocals, producer, writer
Parish Smith – vocals, producer, writer
DJ K La Boss – DJ (scratching)
Jim Foley – engineer
Charlie Marotta – engineer
John Poppo – engineer
Al Watts – engineer/mixing
Gordon Davies – assistant engineer
Rich Rahner – assistant engineer
Herb Powers Jr. – mastering engineer
Janette Beckman – photographer
Eric Haze – artist (EPMD logo art)
Susan Huyser – designer (album artwork)

Release history

Charts

Weekly charts

Year-end charts

Singles

Certifications

References

External links
 Release history: EPMD at Discogs
 Literary Kicks: Album Analysis – by Levi Asher

See also
List of number-one R&B albums of 1988 (U.S.)

1988 debut albums
EPMD albums
Fresh Records (US) albums
Priority Records albums
Albums produced by Erick Sermon